Climate change in South Korea has led to extreme weather events in South Korea that affects: social, economy, industry, culture, and many other sectors. South Korea is experiencing changes in climate parameters. Such parameters include annual temperature, rainfall amounts, and precipitation.

The most distinct climate change predicted for South Korea is an increase in the range of temperature fluctuation throughout the four seasons. The number of record minimum temperature days has decreased rapidly. The maximum precipitation during the summer has increased. The increased possibility for new types of strong weather damage evokes the seriousness and the urgency of climate change. To quickly adapt to climate change, the South Korean government began an effort to reduce greenhouse gas emissions. They are one step closer to having a low-carbon based socio-economic nation.

Industrialization and the increase in population have produced various pollutants and greenhouse gases, which are anthropogenic factors for climate change. In 2017 South Korea was the world's 7th largest emitter of carbon emissions and the 5th largest per capita.

Greenhouse gas emissions 

700 million tonnes of greenhouse gases was emitted in 2019. There was a 3.5% increase in emissions of greenhouse gases after a 6.5% drop in 2020.  Korea is funding construction of overseas coal power.

South Korea is the ninth largest emitter of carbon dioxide. Dangjin Power Station is estimated to have been the coal-fired power plant which emitted the third most carbon dioxide in 2018, at 34 million tons, and relative emissions are estimated at 1.5 kg per kWh.

Impacts on the natural environment

Temperature and weather changes

Precipitation increase

Seoul, the capital city of South Korea, has 228 years of precipitation records, starting with traditional cheugugi rain gauges which is the longest continual instrumental rainfall collection in the world. The record of daily precipitation provides a high-resolution dataset for detecting the singularity of extreme weather events and the multiple decades of precipitation variability. Precipitation was measured with cheugugi from 1778 to 1907, and modern observation equipment was developed and has been used since 1908. Comparing the cheugugi period and the modern period, the modern period shows a significant increase in mean rainfall rate. For example, statistical data for summer precipitation at cheugugi period is 861.8  mm whereas that for the modern period mean is 946.5  mm.

As the amount of rainfall in the last 9 years has increased because the number of heavy rain and torrential rain events have increased in frequency, the risk of heavy rain has become much higher in the southern part of a peninsula than the central region of the Korea peninsula. A large amount of water vapour entering the southern part of the peninsula (Southern coast, Jeju Island) flows into the Yellow Sea in summer and creates a high frequency of torrential rains. On the other hand, the east coast shows a low torrential rain frequency. As of 1990, over the past 20 years and the most recent 20 years, the torrential rain frequency data show a 25% increase in torrential rain watches and a 60% increase in heavy rain warnings.

Changes in precipitation
The tropical rain belt 'Changma front' is created in the Bay of Bengal and the western North Pacific as a sub-system of the East Asian Monsoon. The northward movement of the 'Changma front' is influenced by the development of the subtropical ridge. This northward moving quasi-stationary front is called 'Changma' in South Korea, which represents the main precipitation period.  The 'Changma front' takes about 4 to 5 weeks to go through the Korea Peninsula. This slow movement results in a large, but steady, amount of summer rainfall over the entire Korea Peninsula in late June and July each year. In recent years, the 'Changma front' tended to move quickly, taking less than 3 weeks to go through the Korea Peninsula while pouring down heavy rain showers, along with various sizes of storms from late July to early August. It means that we are having more extreme weather and localized heavy rain occurring after 'Changma'. The dynamics of the 'Changma' rains in the early summer, which derive from baroclinic disturbances that are strongly modified by latent heat release, remain poorly understood. There is also another 'Changma' type which is sometimes called the 'Fall Changma'. This is not, of course, an official term from the Korea Meteorological Administration. However, this 'Fall Changma' is created due to recent climate change. The 'Fall Changma' starts normally in late August to early September. After the North Pacific anticyclone is entirely over in the Korea Peninsula, the 'Fall Changma' is also over. This recent 'Fall Changma' bring a lot more damage than the normal 'Changma' because the 'Fall Changma' pours down extreme heavy rain intensively in a short term. While an increase in rainfall in the absence of the monsoonal circulation shifts is expected, relatively modest shifts or changes in timing can significantly affect East Chinese, Korean and Japanese climates.

Temperature increases

Since 1999, the Korea Global Atmosphere Watch Center located at Anmyeon-do has been monitoring major greenhouse gasses (GHG) such as carbon dioxide (CO), methane, nitrous oxide (NO), and chlorofluorocarbons (CFC-11 and CFC-12). The Anyone-do station is located in a relatively pollution-free environment, an ideal site for observing the background atmosphere of Northeast Asia, including the Korean Peninsula. Among these GHG, CO acts most to change many aspects of the climate factors. The CO concentrations at Anmyeon-do are substantially higher than the global average; the average CO concentration for 2011 was recorded as 395.7 ppm, an increase of 25.0 ppm (6.7%) relative to the annual average of 370.7 ppm for 1999, and 5.2 ppm higher than the global average of 390.5 ppm for the same year as documented by NOAA/GMD. The annual growth rate of CO for the 13 years from 1999 through 2011 was 2.16 ppm/year, which was higher than the global average of 1.9 ppm/year, but it has slowed in recent years.

During the industrialization era (second industrial revolution) over the past few decades, people have been burning fossil fuels (coal, oil, gasoline, natural gas). This releases CO into the atmosphere which contributes the greenhouse effect. A sharp temperature contrast is shown between the urban and rural areas due to this industrialization. The mean temperatures data variations observed at ten meteorological stations in South Korea show an annual mean temperature increase at a rate of 0.52 °C per decade. During the last 29 years, the increase in the annual mean temperature was 1.5 °C for the Seoul station (found in an urban area) and 0.6 °C for the rural and seashore stations. These rate differences are significantly larger over urbanized areas.

South Korea is experiencing a rapid temperature increase. Higher daily maximum and minimum temperatures are very likely to increase in East Asia. There are more severe warm extremes, but less severe cold extremes. These mean temperature increases, especially the temperature increase rate after the 1950s is 1.5 times higher than before the 1950s. The duration of winter is also projected to be a one-month shorter than before, therefore having spring and summer will be 20 days longer during the 1990s compared to what they were during the 1920s seasonal distribution. When average temperature comparison for comparing 20th-century and 21st-century temperature averages, it is shown that there is a 4 °C increase. The mean yearly temperature for South Korea is 10~15 °C, which means that the Korea Peninsula will soon become a subtropical region with an average temperature of over 27 °C. The recent subtropical zone is located on the lower seaside of the Korea Peninsula, but as accelerated temperatures increase, it will result in the subtropical zone move migrating northward. Therefore, by 2100 the subtropical zone is projected to expand its region to the north end of Taebaek Mountains.

Extreme weather events 
Just like other countries, Korea cannot evade the effect of climate change. Increase of flooding and typhoon, and damage from them is significant in recent few decades. The damage to property and loss of lives caused by natural disasters is a typical impact of climate change. Because of this point, decreasing the natural disaster is one of the goals for nations adapting to climate change. Increases in the frequency of flooding, typhoons, or hurricane intensity results in a steady increase of the number of large-scale natural disasters. South Korea is not an exception. Especially, damage from flooding and typhoon is significant. Despite of the increasing threat, the vulnerability to natural disaster, especially typhoon, has been decreased possibly due to multiple factors, such as, improved disaster prevention, changed building codes, industrial structures, and land use.

Impacts on people

Economic impacts
According to the map of industry distribution in Korea, it is noticeable that north-east part of the Korea does not have significant industry. High-tech, heavy and IT industries are placed near the capital, or more close to the sea in the south of Korea. Unlike the industry distribution density, according to the map of damage from natural disaster, the damage is the most dense in the north-east part of the Korea.

Mitigation and adaptation

Mitigation

Carbon trading
There is a carbon trading system.

Green New Deal
The Green New Deal is a plan set up by the ruling party the DPK ahead of the 2020 parliament elections. The plan includes to reach zero emission by 2050, to stop providing construction for coal power plants overseas and to reduce fine dust by 40% in 2040. The government also aims to achieve a target of 40% renewable power by 2034 and the replacement of some coal capacity with liquefied natural gas.

The South Korean president Moon Jae in pledged in September 2020 that South Korea would be carbon free in 2050. The 2030 goal is almost a quarter reduction from 2017 levels.

Society and culture

Population response 
There are about 1.5 million people in South Korea that follow some sort of plant-based diet, and about 500,000 vegans who do not eat any animal products at all. The most common reason blog authors cited for cutting down on meat consumption was for health, with 63.1 percent of blogs mentioning healthy cooking, followed by ethical reasons at 52.9 percent, environmental protection concerns at 36.2 percent, and wanting to lose weight at 26.3 percent.

Company response: Green IT industry

A new Korean Government IT strategy project is projected to have a 20% increase in green IT and IT product by 2012  by the Ministry of Knowledge and Economy. Meanwhile, the Ministry of Public Administration and Security have already started a computational center for green energy-saving and have formulated a comprehensive plan to promote the 'energy-saving'. Through professional organizations comprehensive energy-saving, environmental protection, and budget savings procedures are in progress for energy diagnostic purposes. In addition to what has already been discussed the plan for idle shut-off, demolition equipment, and main contents as 'a green-based computational center for environmental improvement plans' will also go ahead as scheduled.

Activism 
Data from 2021 showed that, for giving the world a 50% chance of avoiding a temperature rise of 2 degrees or more South Korea should increase its climate commitments by 136%. For a 95% chance it should increase the commitments by 487%. For giving a 50% chance of staying below 1.5 degrees South Korea should increase its commitments by 875%.

See also

East Asia Climate Partnership
Energy in South Korea
Environmental issues in South Korea
Climate change in North Korea
 Plug-in electric vehicles in South Korea

References

External links
 South Korea: CO2 Country Profile at Our World in Data
 South Korea at Climate Action Tracker
 Korea Meteorological Administration
 Korea Research Institute of Climate Change
 Climate Change at the Ministry of Environment website

 
South Korea